The Limestone Link is a waymarked footpath in South Lakeland, Cumbria, England, connecting Arnside and Kirkby Lonsdale, a distance of .

Starting at Arnside railway station on the estuary of the River Kent, the path traverses the Arnside and Silverdale AONB, crosses the West Coast Main Line and the M6 motorway, climbs Hutton Roof Crags (an SSSI celebrated for its limestone pavements), and drops down into the market town of Kirkby Lonsdale on the A65 road and the River Lune.

References

External links
 Includes map, profile, and links to further maps
  Arnside railway station 54.191
  Kirkby Lonsdale

South Lakeland District
Footpaths in Cumbria